Hari Fitrianto (born 20 June 1985) is an Indonesian cyclist riding for Banyuwangi RC.

Major results

2007
 8th Overall Tour of Hong Kong Shanghai
2008
 5th Overall Tour d'Indonesia
 5th Overall Jelajah Negeri Sembilan
 8th Overall Tour de East Java
 8th Overall Jelajah Malaysia
2009
 7th Overall Jelajah Malaysia
 10th Overall Tour d'Indonesia
2010
 3rd Overall Tour de East Java
 6th Overall Tour d'Indonesia
1st Stage 1 (TTT)
2011
 1st  Road race, Southeast Asian Games
 8th Overall Tour of Singkarak
2012
 2nd Tour de Jakarta
 4th Overall Tour of East Java
 5th Overall Tour de Ijen
 9th Overall Jelajah Malaysia
2013
 2nd Overall Tour de East Java
2014
 8th Melaka Chief Minister Cup
 10th Overall Tour de Filipinas
2015
 2nd Overall Tour de Borneo
2016
 7th Overall Tour de Ijen
2017
 4th Overall Jelajah Malaysia

References

1985 births
Living people
Indonesian male cyclists
Cyclists at the 2014 Asian Games
Southeast Asian Games medalists in cycling
Southeast Asian Games gold medalists for Indonesia
Competitors at the 2011 Southeast Asian Games
Asian Games competitors for Indonesia
21st-century Indonesian people